Tron Frede Thingstad (born 1946) is a Norwegian scientist. Professor Thingstad is leading a research group on marine microbiology at the Department of Biology, University of Bergen. His work has facilitated understanding the role of microbes in marine ecosystems, including the microbial loop.

In 2009, Thingstad was awarded the prestigious ERC Advanced Investigators Grant to the project "MINOS" (MIcrobial Network OrganiSation), which is focused on microbial networks in the ocean. In 2010, Thingstad received the "Prize for Outstanding Research" of the Norwegian Research Council (informally known as the "Møbius Prize"). According to the jury, his research "has contributed to deeper understanding of topics within marine microbiology, biodiversity, climate research, and ocean acidification". He is also a member of the Norwegian Academy of Science and Letters.

Selected bibliography

References

External links
Scientist profile: Tron Frede Thingstad

1946 births
Living people
Norwegian microbiologists
Norwegian marine biologists
Academic staff of the University of Bergen
Scientists from Bergen
Members of the Norwegian Academy of Science and Letters